NT2 may refer to:
 The NTERA-2 human embryonal carcinoma cell line
 The Nam Theun 2 Dam, a hydroelectric dam located on the Nam Theun River in Laos.
 The Staatsexamen Nederlands als tweede taal NT2, a standardised examination for Dutch language in the Netherlands.
 National Treasure: Book of Secrets, the second movie in the National Treasure series.